Eupithecia brunneata is a moth in the  family Geometridae. It is found in Turkey.

References

Moths described in 1900
brunneata
Moths of Asia